Missin' Twenty Grand is the debut studio album by the American singer and songwriter David Lasley, released in 1982 on EMI Records. It was met with critical acclaim by music journalists including Stephen Holden, Dave Marsh and Don Shewey, among others. Adam Block of The Advocate wrote “In 1982 a little-known album Missin’ Twenty Grand (EMI), cropped up on the year's Top Ten lists of critics for Rolling Stone, The New York Times and The Village Voice.”

The album was produced by Lasley, who wrote or co-wrote six of the ten songs. Thematically, the album centers around longing for his days singing at The 20 Grand, a Detroit club where he made appearances with his group The Utopias.

Pete Townshend, James Taylor, Bonnie Raitt and Luther Vandross make guest appearances along with studio players.  Willie Wilcox, Bill Schnee, Dave Iveland and Joe Wissert are also credited as producers.

"If I Had My Wish Tonight" was issued as the lead single.  “Treat Willie Good” was issued as a single in the UK.

Critical reception

Holden called it one "of the year's most impressive debut albums"..."superbly crafted, organically conceived" and "accessible mainstream pop."

"The blue-eyed soul crooner from the Motor City...pours out his feelings with a tenderness and warmth that recalls the early Chi-Lites and Raindrops"..."falsetto intonations spiced with playfulness, amity and sheer joy."

"Personal and sensitive songs"  Lasley's unique falsetto vocal style works well on both pop and r&b accented tunes"...

“A white boy's homage to Motown, a between-the-lines gay romance, the last of a dying breed of singer-songwriters.”

References

1982 debut albums
EMI Records albums
Albums recorded at A&M Studios